The United States Football League (USFL) is a professional American football minor league that began play on April 16, 2022. As of 2023, the league operates eight teams in four cities, seven of which are east of the Mississippi River; all eight teams bear the brands of teams from a previous incarnation of the United States Football League that operated from 1983 to 1985.

The inaugural 2022 regular season was played in its entirety in Birmingham, Alabama. The postseason games were played in Canton, Ohio, at the Tom Benson Hall of Fame Stadium.

The league is currently owned by National Spring Football League Enterprises Co, LLC, a joint venture between founder Brian Woods and Fox Corporation's sports unit, Fox Sports in the United States. Although the league owns the trademarks of the old USFL, which operated for three seasons during the mid-1980s, the new USFL is not officially associated with that entity. This is the fifth attempt to launch a league using USFL naming, including prior attempts in 1945 (which later became the All-America Football Conference), a league proposed in the 1960s by eventual 1980s USFL founder David Dixon, the aforementioned league that existed between 1983 and 1985, and in 2010. Upon the conclusion of its first season, the league became the first high-level spring football league to complete a season since the original iteration of the XFL, following the early shutdown of the AAF and COVID-19-induced hiatus of the second XFL.

The current USFL champions are the Birmingham Stallions, who won the league's most recent championship game against the Philadelphia Stars on July 3, 2022, 33–30.

History
On June 3, 2021, it was announced that the United States Football League would be making a return and would begin its inaugural season in April 2022. Fox was also announced as a minority owner in the league.

On October 12, 2021, Tad Snider, the executive director of the Birmingham-Jefferson Civic Center Authority, announced that the league was in serious discussions with the board of directors of the BJCC about the possibility of the USFL playing all of its games in Birmingham, Alabama. According to initial information, USFL players/staff would be housed in Birmingham during the season for an estimated economic impact of about $15 million (47,000 hotel nights), while the league would play the bubble season at Protective Stadium and Legion Field. The "bubble" setup may possibly continue in the league's second year, with as many as four teams playing in Birmingham and as many as four in their respective cities. The teams would then be expected to play in their own cities by Season 3.

The proposal included an eight-team 10-week season with two additional playoff rounds, from April 16 through July 3, 2022, with the broadcast proposal as follows: 25% each on Fox, NBC, FS1 and USA. Later on December 15, 2021, Fox and NBC had finalized their agreement. NBC announced that it would air nine games on NBC itself, eight on USA, and four on its streaming service Peacock.

On November 17, 2021, it was announced that The Spring League founder Brian Woods would serve as the league's president, as well as Daryl Johnston as EVP of football operations, Mike Pereira as head of officiating, and Edward Hartman as EVP of business operations.

On January 4, 2022, NBC Sports reported that a “player selection meeting” would be held on February 22 and 23 to set teams. Training camp was to begin on March 21.

On January 6, 2022, four of eight teams unveiled their head coaches and general managers on The Herd with Colin Cowherd, 
 Former San Diego Chargers head coach Mike Riley was named head coach and general manager of the New Jersey Generals. 
 Former Kansas City Chiefs head coach and Pittsburgh Steelers offensive coordinator Todd Haley was named head coach and general manager of the Tampa Bay Bandits. 
 Former University of Houston, Texas A&M University, and University of Arizona head coach Kevin Sumlin was named head coach and general manager of the Houston Gamblers. 
 Former Toronto Argonauts head coach Bart Andrus was named head coach and general manager of the Philadelphia Stars.

Two weeks later on January 20, 2022, two more head coaches were announced. 
 Former Louisiana Tech head coach Skip Holtz was named head coach and general manager of the Birmingham Stallions.
 Former Pittsburgh Steelers running backs coach Kirby Wilson was named head coach and general manager of the Pittsburgh Maulers.

The final two head coaches were announced the following week on January 27, 2022. 
 Former Houston Oilers/Tennessee Titans and St. Louis/Los Angeles Rams Head Coach Jeff Fisher was named head coach and general manager of the Michigan Panthers.
 Former University of Southern Mississippi and University of North Carolina Head Coach and Baylor University Offensive Coordinator/QB Coach Larry Fedora was named head coach and general manager of the New Orleans Breakers.

On January 25, 2022, the city of Birmingham announced that the league headquarters would be in Birmingham, and all games of the 2022 USFL season would be played at Protective Stadium and Legion Field.

The first game was played on April 16, 2022 between the Birmingham Stallions and the New Jersey Generals at Protective Stadium.  The game was broadcast by Fox and NBC, the first football game simulcast on over-the-air broadcast networks since the final week of the 2007 NFL regular season when a game between the New England Patriots and the New York Giants aired on CBS and NBC in addition to cable NFL Network.  Tickets were released to the public at $10 per person; children aged 15 and under were admitted for free.

On February 16, 2022, the league announced that the 2022 Playoffs would be held in Canton, Ohio, at Tom Benson Hall of Fame Stadium instead of Birmingham due to conflicting scheduling with the 2022 World Games.  The following day, on February 17, 2022, the league revealed uniforms for each team. The day after that the league announced the draft order for the 2022 USFL Draft.

On June 27, 2022, Fox Sports confirmed to Sports Business Journal that the USFL would return for another season in 2023. There would be no expansion that year, and the league would continue to use a hub model, with "two to four" locations housing all eight teams. In October 13, the league signed an exclusive partnership agreement with HUB Football.

On November 15, 2022, the USFL and the City of Memphis, Tennessee announced that the Tampa Bay Bandits organization would effectively be relocated to Memphis as the Memphis Showboats, taking on the name and identity of the team from the original incarnation of the league. The team will play all of its home games at Simmons Bank Liberty Stadium, which will also serve as another "hub"" site for the league to host multiple teams at in addition to Birmingham.

Connection to 1980s USFL
There is no legal connection between the new entity and the source of its name, the original United States Football League, which operated from 1983 to 1986 and was officially dissolved in 1990. No principals from the former USFL are involved in the current league's ownership; Brian Woods, who had previously launched the Fall Experimental Football League and The Spring League, was initially the primary owner of the new league. By October 2021, Woods had been demoted to a vice president role as Fox Sports set up a subsidiary, the National Spring Football League, to operate the league. The Spring League, and later the NSFL, acquired most of the USFL's trademarks after the last attempt to revive them, the A-11 Football League, let them go dormant after its own failed launch in 2014. The new USFL did not inherit the old USFL's unpaid liabilities, nor its television contract; it instead holds a new contract with Fox Sports, which already owns both the rights to and an equity stake in The Spring League, and with NBC Sports.

According to Steve Ehrhart, former USFL executive director, he still owns the league rights and the "USFL still exists", while stating that the league officials still get monthly royalty checks. He also mentioned that he refused previous attempts to "buy" the league, "including the people who founded the first version of the XFL". Ehrhart would later explain that he was only "trying to protect the league legacy".

Lawsuit 
On February 28, 2022, "The Real USFL, LLC," a group fronted by Larry Csonka (acting in his capacity as general manager of the original Jacksonville Bulls) and claiming to represent the interests of the owners of the former USFL franchises, filed suit to stop the current USFL from using the name or trademarks associated with the original league. In response, the league attorneys claimed "The new USFL registered its intellectual property rights in 2011".

On April 14 (two days before the scheduled start of the new USFL's regular season), federal judge John F. Walter of the Central District of California denied a preliminary injunction to bar the new USFL from using the original league's name and trademarks, remarking that while the plaintiffs were "likely to prevail" on their claim of trademark infringement, "any alleged harm" could be "easily compensated by monetary damages". The Real USFL, LLC withdrew its suit with prejudice on August 22, 2022.

Rule changes unique to USFL
On March 23, 2022, the USFL announced an initial series of rule tweaks it would implement for its games. The league's rule variations and subsequent changes include the following:

Timing rules 
 The play clock will be 35 seconds, with 25 seconds used for administrative stoppages and penalties.
 For the 2022 season's first three weeks, the game clock will be stopped after each incomplete pass, no matter which point of the game it occurred. Hereafter, the game clock will continue to run after a pass falls incomplete, though only during the odd-numbered quarters (1st and 3rd). This change, announced on the eve of Week 4, was adopted in an effort to reduce game lengths to up to 180 minutes.
 The clock will stop for first downs after the two-minute warning in the second and fourth quarters, similar to the rule the previous incarnation of the league used.
 Halftime will be 15 minutes in length, except during the USFL Championship game, when it will be 30 minutes in duration.

Kickoffs and punts 
 All kickoffs will be from the kicking team's 25-yard line (as opposed to the 35-yard line in the NFL), in an effort to increase opportunities for kick returns and reduce the risk of a touchback.
 No kicking team member may line up further back than one yard behind the ball, while the receiving team must have at least eight players in the setup zone between the kicking team's 35 and 45 yard lines.
 If an untouched kick becomes dead, the ball belongs to the receiving team at that spot.
 A kicking team may not recover or touch its own kickoff beyond 20 yards from the spot of the kick.
 A trailing team can choose to execute either an onside kick under standard rules or, in lieu of a kickoff, attempt to gain 12 yards on a scrimmage play from its own 33-yard line; this "4th and 12" opportunity mirrors a similar rule used in the AAF in 2019 and Fan Controlled Football in 2021.
 On punts, gunners may not line up outside the numbers, nor can they be double-team blocked until the ball is kicked.

Standard play 
 Two forward passes from behind the line of scrimmage are legal; this rule was originally introduced in the XFL in 2020. It will also mean that a pass batted back to the quarterback can be thrown again.
 An offensive lineman may advance downfield on a forward pass play in which the pass does not cross the line of scrimmage.
 A catch must be made with one foot inbounds (same as high-school & NCAA).

Penalties and officiating 
 Defensive pass interference will be penalized similar to college football (15-yard penalty or spot foul if within 15 yards of the line of scrimmage)
 If it is determined the defensive player intentionally interfered with the receiver, the penalty will be a spot foul similar to the NFL rule.
 As in the NFL, no fouls for pass interference or ineligible player downfield will be called if the ball fails to cross the line of scrimmage.
 The league's "Replay Command" center, based at Fox's facilities in Los Angeles, will have the authority to overrule incorrect personal foul calls, including but not limited to roughing the passer, hits on defenseless players, face-mask penalties, and horse-collar tackles. Replay Command will also determine if a pass interference act that occurs 15 yards beyond the line of scrimmage is obviously intentional.
 No chain crew will be used to determine first downs. Instead, the league uses proprietary technology similar to the NFL's Next Gen Stats. A microchip is included in each ball to help pinpoint its location and determine whether the offense has reached the line to gain. The ruling will be displayed on stadium scoreboards and television broadcasts, just as with the Hawk-Eye system used to call in-or-out balls in tennis. Though the USFL indicates that the system will ensure "first down measurements that are more accurate than ever," Profootballtalk.com noted that the technology would not be more accurate than the traditional chain crew, because the technology has a margin of error of approximately the full length of the football.

Replay challenges 
 Each coach will be allowed one replay challenge per game, and will signal their intent to challenge by throwing a red flag.
 If the challenge is not in the favor of the coach who called it, his team will lose a timeout; if successful, he will keep the challenge and receive an additional challenge.
 All challenges and replay reviews will be conducted by USFL Replay Command.
 As in the NFL, replay challenges are automatic in the last two minutes of either half and the whole overtime, as well as any scoring plays and turnovers.

Points after touchdown 
 Teams will have three scrimmage-play options to attempt a point(s) after touchdown:
 A single-point place kick or drop kick from the 15-yard line (same as the NFL).
 Two-point conversion from the three-yard line (same as the NCAA).
 Three-point conversion from the 10-yard line, which the XFL used in both 2001 and 2020 (though neither XFL version allowed a kick-for-PAT option).
 After scoring their touchdown, a team must indicate whether they will go for 1, 2, or 3 points.
 Prior to Week 5 of the first season, the scoring team's extra point decision could not be changed after a penalty or a timeout. At the request of Michigan Panthers coach Jeff Fisher (who was denied an option change in a Week 4 contest), the rule was changed so that an offensive team can use a timeout to change their extra point option, provided they have not already snapped the ball or committed a pre-snap penalty (mirroring the NFL's extra-point rule). If the defense commits a foul before the snap, the scoring team will be allowed to change its option (without losing a timeout), with penalty yardage marked off from the new option spot.
 In any variation of extra-point attempt, a defense can return a fumble, interception, or blocked kick, but will be rewarded with only two points should they reach their opponent's end zone.

Overtime 
Games that are tied after regulation will be resolved with an overtime session that combines elements of college football's overtime system with penalty shootouts used in soccer and ice hockey.
 A coin toss (called by the visiting team) will determine which team will go on offense or defense first, and which end zone will be used (both offenses will attack the same end zone, just as soccer shootouts are attempted at the same goal).
 Teams will attempt three alternating two-point attempts from the two-yard line.
 Whichever team has the most points after the three tries, or after one team gains an insurmountable lead, will be the winner.
 If the teams are still tied after three attempts, teams play multiple rounds until one team scores, which wins it.
 If an offensive team turns the ball over to the defense, the ball is automatically dead and the defense cannot return the ball to their opponent's end zone.
 A team can call one timeout per try.

League finances
Fox Sports owns the league and has reportedly committed $150 million–$200 million over three years to its operations, with plans to attract an additional $250 million from investors. For the 2022 regular season, tickets would be sold at $10 per person, with children aged 15 and under free, for the two semi-final games tickets are sold at $15 per person and children under 15 at $5 those prices are increased by $5 for the championship game.

The league draws revenue of less than $10 million, making it ineligible to seek P visas for players from outside the United States; Liam Dobson, a Canadian offensive lineman, was disqualified from playing in the USFL because of the league's lack of revenue.

Gambling
On March 3, 2022, the league announced fifteen states have approved legal, regulated betting on USFL games.

Players compensation
USFL players and staff are able to receive a college degree "tuition-free and debt-free", through a partnership with for-profit universities Strategic Education’s Capella University and Strayer University. They will be able to take classes online (Capella) or in-person (Strayer), giving them the flexibility to pursue associate, bachelor’s or master’s degrees in business, healthcare, IT and education.

For the 2022 season, player pay structure was $45,000 for Active Roster players, $15,000 for Practice Squad Players, and $600 weekly during training camp. Players also received win bonuses of $850 per win and $10,000 for winning the championship. Players were required to pay their own rent, but the league offered a reduced hotel price at a cost of $75 per room per day, with an option for two players to share a room.

On December 15, 2022 USFL player representatives (United Football Players Association and United Steelworkers) and the league parent company FOX Sports tentatively agreed on a new three-year collective bargaining agreement starting at the 2023 season, six months after the league players voted to unionize. The proposed agreement increases minimum salaries and provides a stronger benefits package than they previously received, and slightly higher than most XFL salaries. USFL players’ minimum salaries will be $5,350 per week, up from the current $4,500 per week payout ($2,500 for inactive players) and $150 a week toward 401K contributions, while weekly performance bonuses will be cancelled. During training camp, all USFL players will get $850 a week. The new deal also include a $400 per week housing stipend. For the first year of the CBA, the roster size will stay at 50 (40 active/10 inactive), while from the second year going forward the makeup changes to 42 active and 8 inactive. The proposed CBA includes an annual opt-out option. The agreement was approved by the union members on January 9, 2023.

Teams 
The league announced the 2022 season will be played "with a minimum of eight teams." In addition to obtaining the rights to the USFL name and logo, the new league has obtained the rights to the aforementioned former league's team names including the Los Angeles Express, Chicago Blitz, Tampa Bay Bandits, and Houston Gamblers. Additionally, the Generals rights are owned by The Spring League, another Woods entity. Since its original announcement, the USFL had purchased more trademarks including new team names like the Birmingham Stallions, Jacksonville Bulls, and Portland Breakers, and variations on the already existing trademarks.

Eight teams were announced on November 22, 2021.  Each of the eight teams originally had a 38-man active roster and a 7-man practice squad. However, the league decided midway through the 2022 season to expand rosters to a 40-man active game day roster, along with a 10-man practice squad

Current teams

Hiatus teams

Timeline 

 " * " indicates Championship Season
 Deactivated Teams in grey

Draft 

The inaugural draft took place on February 22, 2022.

Champions

References

External links

 Official website

Fox Sports
United States Football League (2022)
American football leagues in the United States
Minor and developmental leagues in professional sports
Sports leagues established in 2022
2022 establishments in Alabama